This is a list of fictional cats and felines and is a subsidiary to the list of fictional animals. It includes a limited selection of notable felines from various works, organized by medium. More complete lists are accessible by clicking on the "Main article" link included above each category.  For fictional large felids such as lions and tigers, see List of fictional big cats.

In literature
This section deals with notable cat characters that appear in literature works of fiction including books, comics, legends, myths, folklore, and fairy tales. Any character that appears in several pieces of literature will be listed only once, under the earliest work.

In books

In comics

In legends, myths, folklore and fairy tales

In media
This section deals with notable cat characters that appear in media works of fiction including film, television, animation, and puppetry. Any character that appears in several pieces of media will be listed only once, under the earliest work.

In film

In television

Puss in Boots is the DreamWorks character from Shrek 2 and Puss in Boots of 2011 who appears in the streaming television series, The Adventures of Puss in Boots (2015-2018).  Voiced by Eric Bauza, this is a six season series that streamed on Netflix.  It is a spin-off of the 2011 movie and movies of the Shrek franchise.

On television, the movie, Puss in Boots (2011) was streamed on both Amazon and Netflix. The DreamWorks version of Puss in Boots is a cat from the Shrek franchise, who is also the protagonist of Puss in Boots (2011).  Puss in Boots was voiced by Antonio Banderas in English, Italian & Spanish in the following films: Shrek 2 & Far Far Away Idol in 2004, Shrek the Third (2007), Shrek Forever After (2010), Puss in Boots (2011), Puss in Boots: The Three Diablos (2012), & Puss in Boots: The Last Wish (which will be in theaters in December 2022). 

Puss was voiced by Eric Bauza in the six-season series, The Adventures of Puss in Boots, and by Andé Sogliuzzo & Christian Lanz in the video games. Sogliuzzo also voiced Puss in the series of one-minute web-videos by DreamWorks wherein Puss gives advice to viewers.

On stage

The stage musical Cats features many feline characters known as Jellicle cats.

In animation

In video games
This section deals with notable characters who are prominently featured in various video game titles, either as main characters or notable supporting characters.    

Puss in Boots is in the Shrek series of video games and some of his own.  The Adventures of Puss in Boots, the TV series includes an episode that is an interactive video game called Puss in Book: Trapped in an Epic Tale. Puss was voiced by Eric Bauza in the six-season series, The Adventures of Puss in Boots, and by Andé Sogliuzzo & Christian Lanz in the video games. Sogliuzzo also voiced Puss in the series of one-minute web-videos by DreamWorks wherein Puss gives advice to viewers.    

Puss in Boots was in games related to the Shrek franchise movies. Puss in Boots (video game)  Andre Sogliuzzo is the voice of Puss in Boots in Puss in Boots: The Video Game. There is an interactive video / game with Eric Bauza as Puss In Boots, called Puss in Book that is part of the TV series.  There is a web series with Andé Sogliuzzo (2014-2015) and Christian Lanz (2015-2016) playing Puss in Boots in one-minute webisodes giving everyday advice to his fans.

In advertising and animatronics

See also
List of fictional big cats
List of individual cats
List of catgirls

References

Rovin, Jeff. The Illustrated History of Cartoon Animals. New York: Prentice Hall, 1991, .

Further reading

 
Fictional